The 1980–81 season is Real Madrid Club de Fútbol's 79th season in existence and the club's 50th consecutive season in the top flight of Spanish football.

Summary
Financial worries did hit Luis de Carlos Presidency during summer as a result there had not high-profile transfers in, so, the new arrivals were midfielder Ricardo Gallego (replacing forward Laurie Cunningham injured since November and with physical issues until season finale) goalkeeper Agustín come from its Youth team Castilla and ended loans like Rafael García Cortés. In League the squad was struggling in the middle of the table almost the entire campaign behind local rivals Atlético Madrid until colchoneros collapsed in the final rounds of the tournament and Real Sociedad grabbed the first spot tied in points with Real Madrid but the head-to head matches was in favor of basque side winning its first title ever. In Copa del Rey the club was eliminated in Quarterfinals by Sporting Gijón with an 3–4 aggregate score.

The season is best remembered due to the club's journey around the European Cup defeating Irish side Limerick in First Round, in Eightfinals won 3–0 against Budapest Honved, advancing 2–0 against Soviet side Spartak Moscow in Quarterfinals and won the series 2–1 in semi-finals against Italian Champion F.C. Internazionale Milano reaching its first Final of the tournament after 15 years. Before the final, President Luis de Carlos reached an agreement with a German supplier being the first time ever the club play with a branded shirt openly. However, with Stielike and Cunningham having physical issues the squad lost 0–1 the Final against then-heavily favourites English side Liverpool F.C. recent back-to-back champions in 1977 and 1978.

Squad

Transfers

Competitions

La Liga

Position by round

League table

Matches

Copa del Rey

Round of 16

Quarter-finals

European Cup

Quarter-finals

Semi-finals

Final

Statistics

Players statistics

See also
The Madrid of los Garcia (in Spanish)

References

External links
 BDFútbol

Real Madrid CF seasons
Real Madrid